Sphaerodactylus nigropunctatus,  also known as the black-spotted least gecko or three-banded sphaero, is a species of lizard in the family Sphaerodactylidae. It is found in the Bahamas and Cuba.

References

Sphaerodactylus
Reptiles of the Bahamas
Reptiles of Cuba
Reptiles described in 1845
Taxa named by John Edward Gray